Roy Lee Hopkins (February 28, 1945 – November 29, 1996) was an American football fullback and running back. 

Hopkins was born in Gilmer, Texas, in 1945. He attended Bruce High School in that city and played college football at Texas Southern. 

Hopkins played professional football in the American Football League (AFL) and National Football League (NFL) for the Houston Oilers from 1967 to 1970. He appeared in a total of 53 AFL and NFL games, 15 of them as a starter, totaling 826 rushing yards, 529 receiving yards, and 48 points scored. He sustained a torn cartilage in his knee during the 1970 season and underwent surgery in July 1971 to repair the damage.

References

1945 births
1996 deaths
American football running backs
Houston Oilers players
Texas Southern Tigers football players
Players of American football from Texas
People from Gilmer, Texas